Synaesthesia is a rhetorical device or figure of speech where one sense is described in terms of another. This may often take the form of a simile. One can distinguish the literary joining of terms derived from the vocabularies of sensory domains from synaesthesia as a neuropsychological phenomenon.

Panchronistic tendencies
It has been suggested that, in the tradition of Romantic poetry, the sensory transfer consisting in the synaesthesic metaphor tends to be from a lower (less differentiated) sense to a higher sense. In this respect, the sequence of senses from low to high is generally taken to be touch, taste, smell, sound, then sight. This observation was named a panchronistic tendency by Stephen Ullmann since he saw the lowest levels of sense having the poorest vocabulary. Upwards transfers are thought to have strong emotional effects, but downwards transfers generally witty effects.

Rhetorical synaesthesia as simile 
Examples of synaesthesic simile:
 "his words cut the air like a dagger" (Oscar Wilde, The Picture of Dorian Gray)
 "thy voice is like wine to me" (Oscar Wilde, Salome)

Rhetorical synaesthesia as transmodal modification 
When a modifier which would normally apply to one sense is used collocating a noun evocative of another sense, this is known as transmodal modification. Examples include:
 "mauve Hungarian music" (Oscar Wilde, An Ideal Husband)

Rhetorical synaesthesia as transmodal predication 
When a noun evoking one sense is linked with a predicate evoking another, this is known as transmodal predication. Examples include:

 "My nostrils see her breath burn like a bush." (Dylan Thomas, When all my Five and Country Senses See)
 "the silence that dwells in the forest is not so black" (Oscar Wilde, Salome)

Synaesthetic polysemy 
When a linkage of two senses depends upon a pun, this is known as synaesthetic polysemy. Examples include:

References

Figures of speech
Rhetorical techniques
Literary terminology